District Fellows (also known as DFs) is the name given to the 16- to 20-year-old age group of the Woodcraft Folk, a UK-based cooperative educational movement for children and young people. It operates both on a local group level and as a semi-autonomous movement within the Woodcraft Folk. Woodcraft Folk is very strongly in favour of youth empowerment—to this end the 16- to 20-year-old age group is largely run by the young people.

Groups
Individual DF groups are usually based in a town or city, or in some cases a region. DF group meetings usually consist of a group of like minded individuals meeting up at a regular time and place and taking part in usual woodcraft activities such as co-operative games, organising events, workshops and discussions about the Woodcraft Folk's aims and principles and general socialising.

DFs also help with the running of the younger groups: Venturers, Pioneers, Elfins, and Woodchips; and are an invaluable asset to many districts. The movement has recently set up the New Roots Fund which aims to give grants to new and in need groups.

Organisation

District Fellows Committee
The District Fellows Committee is responsible for overseeing the running of the District Fellows movement. It consists of the following Committee Members:

 Affiliations Rep
The role of the Affiliations Rep is to find like minded organisations and organise collaborative events, projects and campaigns.
 Campaigns Coordinator
The role of the Campaigns Coordinator's role is to facilitate work on the national campaign. The current DF campaign is running from 2013-2014 and is focused on getting the military out of schools.
 Chair of Committee
Chair of Committee is a facilitator of DF committee and provides pastoral support to members of the Committee. 
 Communications Rep
The role of the Communications Rep is to facilitate communication between DF committee and the rest of the movement, as well as manage all DF social media accounts and to help advertise DF events.
 Districts Rep
The role of the Districts Rep is to facilitate communication between DFs and the Districts of the Woodcraft Folk.
 Events Rep
The role of the Events Rep is to find and assist coordination teams for the 3 national social events each year and to organize the 3 Things held each year.
 International Opportunities Rep
 Lay Member (x2)
 MEST-UP Coordinator
 Projects
 Secretary
 Shadow Treasurer
 Training
 Treasurer

Secondary Roles
There are secondary roles, held by members of Committee. They are elected at Old/New (held sometime in October) the change over event between the previous committee and the new reps elected at that years Althing. These secondary roles are:
 Sustainability Rep
 Staff Liaison
 Vice chair
 General Council Rep (x2)
 DF Chair Carer

All positions (except Chair, Treasurer and Shadow Treasurer which are one year roles) are normally 2 year roles.

Other Roles 
In addition, there are also non-committee roles, these are elected every year. 

 Zine Editor
 Web Fairy
 First Aid Fairy
Shadow Event 
 London Liaison Rep 
 Workers' Beer Rep
 Venturer Committee Liaison (replaced with 'Venturer Committee & Venturer Camp Liaison' in the 2 years preceding a Venturer Camp)
Podcast
GC Rep (x2)

See also
Woodcraft Folk
Co-operative Movement
IFM-SEI
Youth activism
Youth voice
Youth participation

References

External links
Span That World (the official DF website)

Youth organisations based in the United Kingdom
The Woodcraft Folk
Youth empowerment organizations
International Falcon Movement – Socialist Educational International